Buford is an unincorporated community in Rio Blanco County, Colorado, United States.

History
A post office called Buford was in operation from 1890 until 1961. The community was named after John Buford, an officer in the American Civil War.

See also

References

External links

Unincorporated communities in Rio Blanco County, Colorado
Unincorporated communities in Colorado